Al Ghubra (also Al-Ghubrah or Ghubrah; Arabic: الغبرة) is a suburb of Muscat, the capital city of the Sultanate of Oman. It is a developing town with a number of malls, hospitals, schools, hotels, and many local businesses. There is a sizeable number of expatriates among the locals. The beach is a long expanse of sand dunes. There are many schools here which are owned by different communities. The town is well planned and known for its lake park designed especially with a walk-path and children's playground. Al-Ghubra is Oman's most popular shopping destination, with Muscat Grand Mall Oman Avenue Mall and Panorama Mall being two of the options. Also in this area, a lot of hotels, restaurants, and coffee shops are available. Many cuisines like Indian, Chinese, Italian, Arabic, Continental, & Latin are available here.

References

Suburbs of Muscat, Oman